"Straight to Hell" is a song by the Clash, from their album Combat Rock. It was released as a double A-side single with "Should I Stay or Should I Go" on 17 September 1982 in 12" and 7" vinyl format (the 7" vinyl is also available as a picture disc).

Writing and recording 
"Straight to Hell" was written and recorded towards the very end of the Clash's New York recording sessions for the Combat Rock album. Mick Jones' guitar technician Digby Cleaver describes the sessions as "a mad, creative rush" that occurred on 30 December 1981, the day before the Clash was due to fly out of New York on New Year's Eve 1981.

Joe Strummer reflected on this creative process in a 1991 piece about the track:

Lyrical themes 
"Straight to Hell" has been described by writer Pat Gilbert as being saturated by a "colonial melancholia and sadness".

Like many songs by the Clash, the lyrics of "Straight to Hell" decry injustice.  The first verse refers to the shutting down of steel mills in Northern England and unemployment spanning generations, it also considers the alienation of non-English speaking immigrants in British society.

The second verse concerns the abandonment of children in Vietnam who were fathered by American soldiers during the Vietnam War. The phrase "Amerasian Blues" is used, referring to an Amerasian child with an absent American father, "papa-san". The child has a photograph of his parents, and is pleading with his father to take him home to America. The child's plea is rejected. "-San" is a Japanese rather than Vietnamese honorific, but it was used by US troops in Vietnam who referred to Vietnamese men and women, especially older men and women, as "mama-san" or "papa-san".

When Strummer sings of a "Volatile Molotov" thrown at Puerto Rican immigrants in Alphabet City as a message to encourage them to leave, he is referring to the arson that claimed buildings occupied by immigrant communities – notably Puerto Rican – before the area was subject to gentrification.

Musical style 
The song has a distinctive drum beat. "You couldn't play rock 'n' roll to it. Basically it's a Bossa Nova." said Topper Headon. Joe Strummer has said "Just before the take, Topper said to me "I want you to play this" and he handed me an R Whites lemonade bottle in a towel. He said "I want you to beat the bass drum with it."

Alternative version 
The Combat Rock version of the song had a duration of 5:30 minutes. This version was edited down from the original track, which lasted almost 7 minutes. The original track featured extra lyrics and a more prominent violin part.

The decision to edit the song down from 7:00 down to 5:30 was part of the early 1982 mixing sessions whereby The Clash and Glyn Johns edited Combat Rock down from a 77-minute double album down to a 46-minute single album.

The full, unedited version of "Straight to Hell" can be found on the Clash on Broadway and Sound System box sets.

Personnel 
 Joe Strummer - vocal
 Mick Jones - guitars, keyboards, sound effects
 Paul Simonon - bass guitar
 Topper Headon - drums

Reception 
NME reviewer Adrian Thrills in 1982 gave the double A-side single release "Straight to Hell"/"Should I Stay or Should I Go" four-and-a-half stars out of five. Despite "Should I Stay or Should I Go" having received more radio airplay, Thrills wrote that "Straight to Hell" "reaffirm[s] that there is still life in The Clash." Vulture cited it as "punk poetry of the highest order, and maybe real poetry too."

Use in other media 
This song was featured in the 2000 comedy film, Kevin & Perry Go Large and in Complicity from that same year.

Notable covers and samples 
"Straight to Hell" has been covered or sampled by many artists.  Heather Nova and Moby covered the song in 1999 for the Clash tribute album Burning London.  In 2007, British singer M.I.A. sampled "Straight to Hell" in her song "Paper Planes" which, like "Straight to Hell", deals with the topic of immigration. "Paper Planes" was itself sampled in Jay-Z and T.I.'s 2008 song "Swagga Like Us"; the songwriters of "Straight To Hell" received co-writing credits for both songs.

The song was refashioned by Mick Jones and Lily Allen for the War Child: Heroes album, released in the UK on 16 February 2009, and in the U.S. on 24 February 2009 by Astralwerks. Jakob Dylan and Elvis Costello performed a cover of the song on season 1, episode 12 of Costello's show Spectacle: Elvis Costello with..., entitled "She & Him, Jenny Lewis and Jakob Dylan" and aired on Channel 4 in the UK, CTV in Canada, and the Sundance Channel in the United States in 2008–2009.  While the Clash were known for covering (and popularizing) reggae songs, "Straight to Hell" went in the other direction, being covered by Horace Andy in 2017.

American punk rock band the Menzingers covered the song in a noise-influenced format on their 2007 debut album A Lesson in the Abuse of Information Technology.

See also 
 Bụi đời

References 

1982 singles
Anti-war songs
The Clash songs
Protest songs
Songs of the Vietnam War
Songs against racism and xenophobia
1982 songs
Songs written by Joe Strummer
Songs written by Mick Jones (The Clash)
Songs written by Paul Simonon
Songs written by Topper Headon
CBS Records singles